Leonor Izquierdo (12 June 1894 – 1 August 1912) was the muse and wife of the poet Antonio Machado, who met her at the age of thirteen when he was working as a teacher in Soria.

Leonor was the daughter of Isabel Cuevas and Ceferino Izquierdo, sergeant of the Guardia Civil. 
She was born at Almenar de Soria where her father was based.

Antonio Machado agreed with Isabel Cuevas to marry Leonor. At 10:00 A.M. on 30 July 1909 they married at the Church of Santa María la Mayor in Soria. At the time, she was fifteen years old; the average age of marriage for women at the time was twenty-five.
 
The couple was living in Paris in 1911. After being diagnosed with advanced tuberculosis, she returned to Soria to get rest and died on 1 August 1912. She was buried there in Cementerio del Espino (Hawthorn Cemetery). Machado wrote a series of poems dealing with the loss of Leonor, but he never returned to Soria after her death.
Machado's friend visited her grave to put the next poem by the poet:

References

Bibliography

 

1894 births
1912 deaths
People from the Province of Soria
Burials in the Province of Soria
20th-century deaths from tuberculosis
20th-century Spanish women
Tuberculosis deaths in Spain